Ponce, Puerto Rico's second-largest city outside the San Juan metropolitan area, receives over 100,000 visitors annually.

Ponce's sights include monuments and architecture, such as its Monumento a la Abolición de la Esclavitud and Residencia Armstrong-Poventud, and pink marble curbs and chamfered streets corners, as well as historic houses, castles and concert halls. There are also more modern attractions such as its seafront Tablado La Guancha as well as attractions that date back some 1500 years, like the Tibes Indigenous Ceremonial Center. The city has been called "the most Puerto Rican city in Puerto Rico."

Within the city's urban area

Within the Ponce Historic Zone

Museums

 Museo Parque de Bombas
 Museo Francisco "Pancho" Coimbre
 Museo de la Historia de Ponce
 Museo de Arte de Ponce
 Museo de la Arquitectura Ponceña
 Museo de la Música Puertorriqueña
 Museo de la Masacre de Ponce
 Museo del Autonomismo Puertorriqueño
 Museo Casa Paoli

Parks

 Plaza Las Delicias
 Plaza Degetau
 Plaza Muñoz Rivera
 Parque de la Ceiba
 Parque Lineal Veredas del Labrador 
 Parque Urbano Dora Colón Clavell
 Parque del Tricentenario
 Parque de la Abolición
 Parque Ecológico Urbano

Monuments

 Monumento a la abolición de la esclavitud
 Monumento a los heroes de El Polvorín (obelisk)

Historic houses

 Casa Vives (1860)
 Casa Paoli (1864)
 Residencia Ermelindo Salazar (1870)
 Casa Saurí (1882)
 Casa Rosaly–Batiz (1897)
 Residencia Armstrong-Poventud (1899)
 Residencia Subirá (1910)
 Casa Salazar-Candal (1911)
 Centro Español de Ponce (1911)
 Casa Serrallés (1911)
 Casa Wiechers-Villaronga (1912)
 Casa Oppenheimer (1913)
 Casa Rosita Serrallés (1926)

Churches

 Catedral Nuestra Señora de Guadalupe - located at Plaza Las Delicias
 Iglesia de la Santísima Trinidad - first Protestant church in Latin America (1873)
 Primera Iglesia Metodista Unida de Ponce 
 Iglesia Metodista Unida de la Playa de Ponce

Historic commercial institutions
 Hotel Meliá (1895)
 Ponce Plaza Hotel & Casino (1882)
 Banco Crédito y Ahorro Ponceño (1924)
 Banco de Ponce (1924)

20th and 21st century architecture

 Coliseo Pachin Vicens (1972)   
 Universidad Catolica de Puerto Rico (1948) 
 La Guancha (1990)
 Concha Acústica de Ponce (1956) - one of the venues for Banda Municipal de Ponce
 Complejo Ferial de Puerto Rico (2012)

Theaters

 Teatro La Perla (1864)
 Teatro Fox Delicias
 Concha Acústica de Ponce

Shopping

 Paseo Atocha - charming 20th century shopping experience
 Los Chinos de Ponce - ice cream parlor over 50 years old 
 Fox Delicias Mall - historic theater-turned-shopping mall (now closed)
 Plaza de Mercado de Ponce - historic farmer's market marketplace
 Mercado de las Carnes - aka, Plaza Juan Ponce de León

Cultural institutions

 Centro Cultural de Ponce Carmen Sola de Pereira 
 Biblioteca Municipal de Ponce - at Boulevard Mguel Pou
 Banda Municipal de Ponce, located at Centro Integrado para el Fortalecimiento de las Artes Musicales (1864) 
 Antiguo Casino de Ponce

Festivals and events

 Carnaval de Ponce 
 Día Mundial de Ponce 
 Feria de Artesanías de Ponce 
 Festival Nacional de la Quenepa  
 Las Mañanitas  
 Fiesta Nacional de la Danza 
 Ponce Jazz Festival
 Ponce Marathon
 Cruce a Nado Internacional

Others
 Campo Atlético Charles H. Terry
 Albergue Caritativo Tricoche
 Antiguo Cuartel Militar Español de Ponce
 Antiguo Hospital Militar Español de Ponce
 Ponce Servicios - building with the largest footprint in the city
 Casa Alcaldía de Ponce (1840)

Outside the Ponce Historic Zone

Museums

 Museo de Arte de Ponce
 Museo Castillo Serrallés

Cemeteries
 Cementerio Civil de Ponce – burial site for Hector Lavoe and many other prominent Puerto Ricans
 Cementerio Católico San Vicente de Paul - NRHP#88001249
 Panteón Nacional Román Baldorioty de Castro (1842) - the burial site of many illustrious citizens

Historic homes

 Castillo Serrallés (1930) - HRHP# 80004494, a "castle" built by Pedro Adolfo de Castro for rum baron Juan Eugenio Serrallés
 Casa Fernando Luis Toro (1927) - NRHP# 86000421

Others
 Monumento a los heroes de El Polvorín (tomb) (1911) - to the seven men that saved the city from a devastating fire in 1899
 Cruceta del Vigía - lookout for panoramic views of the city and Caribbean Sea, located next to Museo Castillo Serrallés
 Ponce YMCA - NRHP# 12000331
 Calle 25 de Enero -  historic Victorian village, home to Ponce firefighters and their families 
 Iglesia Metodista Unida de la Playa de Ponce - NRHP #08000283
 Plaza del Caribe
 Centro del Sur Mall
 Grand Prix de Ponce - speedway
 Villa Pesquera - fishing village
 Club Náutico de Ponce - private sports complex, viewable from the La Guancha Boardwalk
 Complejo Ferial de Puerto Rico - convention center

Outside the city's urban area

Beaches

 Playa Pelícano Beach - a Blue Flag beach
 El Tuque Beach
 La Guancha Beach

Mountains

 Cerro Punta - It is Puerto Rico's tallest, and both northern and southern coasts of the island can be seen on clear days
 Monte Jayuya - Puerto Rico's second tallest peak
 Cerro Maravilla - Known as El Cerro de los Mártires, it is the annual gathering point for independence activists
 Cerro del Vigía - Home to Cruceta del Vigía, Museo Castillo Serrallés, and (now closed) Hotel Ponce Intercontinental

Parks, forests and recreational areas
 Caja de Muertos
 Parque Luis A. "Wito" Morales
 Parque Ceremonial Indigena de Tibes 
 Cerrillos State Forest
 Toro Negro State Forest 
 Cerrillos Dam
 La Guancha Boardwalk
 Reserva Natural Punta Cucharas

Others
 Hacienda Buena Vista - 19th century coffee plantation
 Destileria Serralles - makers of Ron Don Q 
 Portugues Dam

See also

 List of barrios of Ponce, Puerto Rico
 Porta Caribe
 List of people from Ponce, Puerto Rico
 List of islands of Ponce, Puerto Rico

References

Tourist attractions
Ponce, Puerto Rico
Ponce